Nasir Khan (11 January 1924 – 3 May 1974) was an Indian actor. He was the younger brother of actor Dilip Kumar and is the father of actor Ayub Khan.

Career
Nasir Khan made his acting debut in the 1945 film Mazdoor. After a few films, he shifted to Lahore after Partition and starred in the first ever Pakistani film Teri Yaad in 1948. He acted in another Pakistani film, Shahida in 1949. Both films failed to do well and Nasir returned to India in 1951. He resumed his acting career in Bombay, acting in several films throughout the 1950s.
His movie Nagina (1951) with Nutan was a big hit. The two of them formed a memorable pair who also starred together in two more films, Aagosh and Sheesham. Nasir Khan also enacted the role of Jumna alongside his real life brother Dilip Kumar, who played the role of Gunga in the 1961 dacoit drama Bollywood film Gunga Jumna. This was his last film for a decade. He returned to films in the early 1970s playing cameos in Yaadon Ki Baraat (1973) and his final film Bairaag (1976) which released after his death.

Personal life
Nasir Khan was born to Ayesha Begum and Lala Ghulam Sarwar Ali Khan in a Hindko-speaking Awan family of 12 children in Bombay. His father was a landlord and fruit merchant who owned orchards in Peshawar and Deolali. Nasir Khan was first married to Suraiya Nazir, daughter of legendary filmmaker Nazir Ahmed Khan. From this marriage, he had a daughter Naheed Khan. Later he was married to actress Begum Para and their son is actor Ayub Khan.

Death
Nasir Khan died on 3 May 1974 at the age of 50. Before his death, he had returned to films after a decade, playing small role in Yaadon Ki Baaraat (1973) and his final film Bairaag (1976), which was released after his death.

Filmography

See also
 Khans of Bollywood

References

1924 births
1974 deaths
20th-century Indian male actors
Indian male film actors